The 1959–60 NHL season was the 43rd season of the National Hockey League. The Montreal Canadiens were the Stanley Cup winners as they defeated the Toronto Maple Leafs four games to none for their fifth straight Stanley Cup.

Regular season 

This regular season, like the two preceding it and the two following it, belonged to the Montreal Canadiens, who were in the midst of five straight first overall finishes and at the tail end of five straight Stanley Cup victories. The Detroit Red Wings, who were dead last and missed the playoffs the previous season, squeaked into the playoffs by riding a Hart Memorial Trophy performance by their ageless star right-winger, Gordie Howe.

The season was marked by important changes in the NHL, as Canadiens goaltender Jacques Plante, like Clint Benedict before him, began to wear a mask in hockey games. Plante, who had asthma-related problems throughout his career, first began wearing a mask in practice shortly after a sinus operation in 1957. On November 1, 1959, Plante's nose was broken by a shot from New York Rangers right-winger Andy Bathgate. After being stitched up, Plante insisted on wearing a mask for the remainder of the game. Montreal coach Toe Blake was bitterly opposed to the idea, but did not have a backup goaltender and relented after Plante said he would not return to the ice without a mask. Although many in the NHL disapproved of Plante's decision due to NHL tradition at the time, many followed suit after Plante went undefeated in ten games with the mask on.

Phil Watson suffered an ulcer and was quietly dismissed as Ranger coach and replaced by Alf Pike. Gump Worsley was demoted to the Springfield Indians of the AHL and Worsley screamed he was finished with hockey, but reported to Springfield anyway. Indians owner Eddie Shore, known for his criticism of his players, gave Worsley a surprise vote of confidence. Gump played well for the Indians.

There was trouble brewing for Rangers right-winger Andy Bathgate, who had ripped open Plante's nose on the night of the goalie mask's official NHL debut. In a January 1960 True Magazine article ghosted by Dave Anderson, the defending league MVP listed the names of players whom he considered guilty of the dangerous act of spearing. This was brought to the attention of NHL President Clarence Campbell, who fined Bathgate $500 and Ranger general manager Muzz Patrick $100 on the grounds the article was prejudicial to and against the welfare of the league.

After being demoted to Springfield, Gump Worsley was brought back up as Marcel Paille was even worse in goal for New York. Gump and the Rangers beat the Canadiens 8–3 in his first game back on January 3, but on January 21, Montreal bombed Worsley 11-2. Later against the Chicago Black Hawks, Worsley suffered an injury that finished him for the season; Hawks' winger Bobby Hull skated over his catching glove and severed two tendons in his fingers. Al Rollins was called up to replace him. Later, Olympic hero Jack McCartan played a few games for the Rangers, acquitting himself very well.

The Boston Bruins narrowly missed the playoffs despite a flurry of offense, sparked by the "Uke Line" of Johnny Bucyk, Vic Stasiuk, and Bronco Horvath. Horvath finished a close second to Chicago's Bobby Hull in the scoring race and was named to the Second All-Star Team. Slick centre Don McKenney led the NHL in assists while winning the Lady Byng Trophy and versatile Doug Mohns also contributed. 1959–60 saw two veteran Bruins, centre Fleming MacKell and goaltender Harry Lumley, play their last campaigns before retirement.

This season marked the first season of the Original Six era during which every active player had played for Original Six teams only. Ken Mosdell, the last player to play for another team, retired the previous season.

Final standings

Stanley Cup playoffs

Montreal played the minimum number of games, 8, to win the Stanley Cup and in the process, became the last Cup winners in NHL history to go undefeated in the playoffs to date. After winning the Stanley Cup, Maurice Richard retired from the NHL as a champion.

Playoff bracket

Semifinals

(1) Montreal Canadiens vs. (3) Chicago Black Hawks

(2) Toronto Maple Leafs vs. (4) Detroit Red Wings

Stanley Cup Finals

Awards
Gordie Howe won the Hart Trophy to become the first five-time winner of the Hart. In voting, he received 118 votes of a possible 180, twice as many as runner-up Bobby Hull. Howe was the last winner of the original Hart Trophy. The trophy was retired to the Hockey Hall of Fame and the NHL began presenting a new trophy, which was dubbed the Hart Memorial Trophy in its place. Hull won the Art Ross Trophy for the scoring championship, his first. Doug Harvey won the Norris Trophy for the fifth time, and the fifth time in the seven times it had been awarded. The Canadiens had the lowest goals against average, for the fifth consecutive time, and Jacques Plante was awarded his fifth Vezina Trophy. The Black Hawks' Glenn Hall was named to the First All-Star team as goaltender.

All-Star teams

Player statistics

Scoring leaders
Note: GP = Games played; G = Goals; A = Assists; Pts = Points

Leading goaltenders
Note: GP = Games played; MIN = Minutes played; GA = Goals against; SO = Shut outs; AVG = Goals against average

Coaches
Boston Bruins: Milt Schmidt
Chicago Black Hawks: Rudy Pilous
Detroit Red Wings: Sid Abel
Montreal Canadiens: Toe Blake
New York Rangers: Phil Watson and Alfred Pike
Toronto Maple Leafs: Punch Imlach

Debuts
The following is a list of players of note who played their first NHL game in 1959–60 (listed with their first team, asterisk(*) marks debut in playoffs): 
Dallas Smith, Boston Bruins
Bill Hay, Chicago Black Hawks
J. C. Tremblay, Montreal Canadiens
Dave Balon, New York Rangers
Ken Schinkel, New York Rangers

Last games
The following is a list of players of note that played their last game in the NHL in 1959–60 (listed with their last team): 
Fleming MacKell, Boston Bruins
Maurice Richard, Montreal Canadiens
Al Rollins, New York Rangers
Harry Lumley, Boston Bruins
Dave Creighton, Toronto Maple Leafs

See also 
 1959-60 NHL transactions
 List of Stanley Cup champions
 13th National Hockey League All-Star Game
 National Hockey League All-Star Game
 Ice hockey at the 1960 Winter Olympics
 1959 in sports
 1960 in sports

References

 
 
 

 

 
 

 
Notes

External links
Hockey Database
NHL.com

 
1959–60 in American ice hockey by league
1959–60 in Canadian ice hockey by league